This is a list of artists (painters, sculptors, architects and printmakers) who were born and/or were primarily active in Croatia. The artists are sorted by century and then alphabetically by last name.

13th century
Andrija Buvina
Radovan (Majstor Radovan); sculptor

15th century
Andrija Aleši (1425–1505); sculptor and architect
Nikola Božidarević (c. 1460–1517); painter
Lovro Dobričević (c. 1420–1478); painter
Francesco Laurana (Frane Vranjanin) (c. 1430–1502); sculptor
Giorgio da Sebenico (Juraj Dalmatinac) (c. 1410–1473); sculptor

16th century
Julije Klović (1498–1578); painter

18th century
Federiko Benković (1667–1753)
Ivan Ranger (1700–1753)

19th century
Vlaho Bukovac (1855–1922); painter
Menci Klement Crnčić (1865–1930); painter
Vjekoslav Karas (1821–1858); painter
Celestin Medović (1857–1920); painter
Slava Raškaj (1877–1906); painter
Ivan Rendić (1849–1932); sculptor
Adolf Waldinger (1843–1904); painter

20th century
Alfred Albini (1896–1978); architect
Oskar Alexander (1876–1953); painter 
Antun Augustinčić (1900–1979); sculptor
Viktor Axmann (1878–1946); architect
Ljubo Babić (1890–1974); painter, graphic artist, set designer
Robert Baća (1949-2019); painter and sculptor
Vjekoslav Bastl (1872–1947); architect
Vladimir Becić (1886–1954); painter
Lujo Bezeredi (1898–1979); painter
Charles Billich (b. 1934); painter
Slavko Brill (1900–1943); sculptor
Bela Čikoš Sesija (1864–1931); painter
Josip Crnobori (1907–2005); painter
Tošo Dabac (1907–1970); photographer
Ante Dabro (b. 1938); sculptor
Branislav Dešković (1883–1939); sculptor
Marijan Detoni (1883–1939); painter and graphic artist
Julio Deutsch (1859–1922); architect
Josip Demirović Devj (1939–1999); painter and sculptor
Jelena Dorotka (1876–1965); painter
Dušan Džamonja (1928–2009); sculptor
Hugo Ehrlich (1879–1936); architect
Eva Fischer (1920–2015); painter
Ignjat Fischer (1870–1948); architect
Robert Frangeš Mihanović (1872–1940); sculptor
Vilko Gecan (1894–1973); painter
Ivan Generalić (1914–1992); painter
Stjepan Gomboš (1895–1975); architect 
Oton Gliha (1914–1999); painter
Petar Grgec (1933–2006); painter
Krsto Hegedušić (1901–1975); painter and illustrator
Oskar Herman (1886–1974); painter
Leo Hönigsberg (1861–1911); architect
Josip Horvat Međimurec (1904–1945); painter
Drago Ibler (1894–1964); architect
Oton Iveković (1869–1939); painter
Sanja Iveković (b. 1949); photographer, sculptor
Ignjat Job (1895–1936); painter
Jozo Kljaković (1889–1969); painter
Julije Knifer (1924–2004); painter
Viktor Kovačić (1874–1924); architect
Ivan Kožarić (b. 1921); sculptor
Miroslav Kraljević (1885–1913); painter
Frano Kršinić (1897–1982); sculptor
Alfred Freddy Krupa (b. 1971); painter
Heddy Kun (b. 1936); painter
Ivan Lacković Croata (1932–2004); painter
Vasko Lipovac (1931–2006); painter and sculptor
Zvonimir Lončarić (1927–2004); painter and sculptor
Slavko Löwy (1904–1996); architect
Rudolf Lubinski (1873–1935); architect
Ivan Meštrović (1883–1962); sculptor
Ivan Milat (1922–2009); painter
Antun Motika (1902–1992); painter
Franjo Mraz (1910–1981); painter
Marko Murat (1864–1944); painter
Edo Murtić (1921–2005); painter
Oscar Nemon (1906–1985); sculptor
Alfred Pal (1920–2010); painter 
Renato Percan (1936–2013); painter
Ordan Petlevski (1930–1997); painter
Ivan Picelj (1924–2011); painter
Stjepan Planić (1900–1980); architect
Vera Nikolić Podrinska (1886–1972); painter
Oton Postružnik (1900–1978); painter
Ivan Rabuzin (1921–2008); painter
Josip Račić (1885–1908); painter
Mirko Rački (1879–1982); painter
Ivan Rein (1905–1943); painter 
Vjenceslav Richter (1917–2002); architect
Toma Rosandić (1878–1958); sculptor
Ana Sladetić (b. 1985); painter
Miljenko Stančić (1926–1977); painter
Vladimir Šterk (1891–1941); architect
Miroslav Šutej (1936–2005); painter and printmaker
Marino Tartaglia (1894–1984); painter
Ivana Tomljenović-Meller (1906–1988); graphic designer
Marija Ujević-Galetović (b. 1933); sculptor
Milivoj Uzelac (1897–1977); painter
Maksimilijan Vanka (1889–1963); painter
Vladimir Varlaj (1895–1962); painter
Mladen Veža (1916–2010); painter and illustrator
Mirko Virius (1889–1943); painter

21st century
Stanka Gjuric (b. 1956); filmmaker

See also
 List of Croatian architects

References

Artists

Croatian artists
Artists